The 2022 Alabama elections were held on Tuesday, November 8, 2022. The primary elections were held on May 24, 2022, with runoffs taking place on June 21, 2022.

The state elected its class III U.S. Senator, 4 of 9 members of the Alabama State Board of Education, all of its seats in the House of Representatives, 2 of 9 seats on the Supreme Court of Alabama, 4 of 10 seats on the Alabama Appellate Court and all seats of the Alabama House of Representatives and the Alabama Senate. It also voted on five ballot measures.

Federal offices

United States class III Senate seat

Republican incumbent Richard Shelby retired. Republican Katie Britt won the open seat against Democrat Will Boyd.

United States House of Representatives

Alabama has seven seats in the House of Representatives. Six are held by Republicans, and one is held by a Democrat. Five of the Republicans and the one Democrat won reelection. One Republican, Mo Brooks from the 5th Congressional District, retired, and was succeeded by Republican Dale Strong.

State

Executive

Governor

Incumbent Republican governor Kay Ivey won re-election against Democrat Yolanda Flowers.

Lieutenant governor

Incumbent Republican lieutenant governor Will Ainsworth won re-election against Libertarian Ruth Page Nelson.

Attorney General

Incumbent Republican Attorney General Steve Marshall won re-election against Democrat Wendell Major.

Agriculture Commissioner

Incumbent Republican Agriculture Commissioner Rick Pate won re-election against Libertarian Jason Clark.

State Auditor

Republican Andrew Sorrell won election against Libertarian Leigh LaChine.

Secretary of State

Republican Wes Allen won election against Democrat Pamela Laffitte.

State Treasurer

Republican Young Boozer won election against Libertarian Scott Hammond.

Legislature
Every member of the Alabama state legislature was up for election in 2018. Both state senators and state representatives serve four-year terms in Alabama. After the 2018 elections, Republicans maintained control of both chambers. In 2018, all 35 Alabama Senate seats and all 105 Alabama House of Representatives seats were up for election. These seats will not be contested in a regularly-scheduled election again until 2026.

House of Representatives

Republicans won 77 seats while Democrats won 28 seats. The Republican Party gained 5 seats.

Senate

Republicans won 27 while Democrats won 8 seats. The Republican Party gained 1 seat, the 29th, which was held by an retiring independent who caucused with the Republicans.

Judiciary
The state Supreme Court has 9 seats, all of which are currently occupied by Republican incumbents. At the appellate level, 2 of 5 seats on Alabama Court of Civil Appeals and 2 of 5 on the Alabama Court of Criminal Appeals are up for election. All seats on both courts are currently held by the Republican Party.

State Supreme Court, place five

Democratic primary

Nominee
Anita L. Kelly

Republican primary

Candidates
Greg Cook, attorney
Debra H. Jones, judge

Polling

Results

General election

Notes

Partisan clients

References

External links
 
 
  (State affiliate of the U.S. League of Women Voters)
 
 . ("Deadlines, dates, requirements, registration options and information on how to vote in your state")
 

 
Alabama
Alabama elections by year